Caribicus warreni, commonly known as the Haitian giant galliwasp or the Hispaniolan giant galliwasp, is a species of lizard in the family Diploglossidae. The species is endemic to the island of Hispaniola.

Taxonomy 
It was formerly classified in the genus Celestus, but was moved to Caribicus in 2021.

Etymology
The specific name, warreni, is in honor of Mr. C. Rhea Warren who collected herpetological specimens on Île de la Tortue.

Geographic range
C. warreni is found in both the Dominican Republic and Haiti.

Description
True to its common name, C. warreni is a large anguid, weighing in at 68 grams (2.4 ounces).

Habitat
The natural habitat of C. warreni are Hispaniolan moist forests underneath leaf litter and forest debris.

Diet
The giant Hispaniolan galliwasp is an opportunistic predator that feed on insects, earthworms, small mammals, and other reptiles.

Conservation status
C. warreni is threatened by habitat loss, predation by invasive species (such as the small Indian mongoose), and collection for the illegal pet trade. Persecution is also an issue; the galliwasp is erroneously believed to be venomous by locals, and is often killed on sight across the island.

References

Further reading
Schwartz A (1970). "A new species of large Diploglossus (Sauria: Anguidae) from Hispaniola". Proc. Biol. Soc. Washington 82: 777–788. (Diploglossus warreni, new species).
Schwartz A, Thomas R (1975). A Check-list of West Indian Amphibians and Reptiles. Carnegie Museum of Natural History Special Publication No. 1. Pittsburgh, Pennsylvania: Carnegie Museum of Natural History. 216 pp. (Diploglossus warreni, p. 122).

Caribicus
Reptiles described in 1970
Taxonomy articles created by Polbot
Reptiles of the Dominican Republic
Reptiles of Haiti
Endemic fauna of Hispaniola
Lizards of the Caribbean
Taxa named by Albert Schwartz (zoologist)
Species endangered by the pet trade